Wilber may refer to:

Wilber (surname)
Wilber (given name)
Wilber, Nebraska, a city, United States
Wilber Township, Michigan, United States
Wilber (mascot), mascot of GIMP, a free graphics editor

See also
Wilbur (disambiguation)
Wilbour (disambiguation)
Wilbor (disambiguation)
Wilbär, a polar bear living in captivity